Inés Gorrochategui and Patricia Tarabini were the defending champions, but none competed this year.

Amanda Coetzer and Linda Harvey Wild won the title by defeating Kristie Boogert and Laura Golarsa 6–4, 3–6, 6–2 in the final.

Seeds

Draw

Draw

References

External links
 Official results archive (ITF)
 Official results archive (WTA)

1994 - Doubles
Doubles